The President of the Senate of Trinidad and Tobago is generally elected from the government benches. The president chairs debates in the chamber of the Senate of Trinidad and Tobago and stands in for the country's president during periods of absence or illness (Constitution of Trinidad and Tobago, section 27). A Vice-President of the Senate is also elected from among the senators. The current President of the Senate is Senator Nigel de Freitas.

Presidents of the Senate

Vice-Presidents of the Senate

References
https://web.archive.org/web/20080509070703/http://www.ttparliament.org/html/Pstpres.htm

President
Trinidad and Tobago, Senate
 
President of the Senate